Tanjung Ipoh is a small town in Kuala Pilah District, Negeri Sembilan, Malaysia.

References

Kuala Pilah District
Towns in Negeri Sembilan